Åsa Svensson was the defending champion, but did not compete this year.

Vera Zvonareva won the title by defeating Conchita Martínez Granados 6–1, 6–3 in the final.

Seeds
The first two seeds received a bye into the second round.

Draw

Finals

Top half

Bottom half

References

External links
 Official results archive (ITF)
 Official results archive (WTA)

Croatian Bol Ladies Open - Singles
Croatian Bol Ladies Open
2003 in Croatian women's sport